Should I Worry About...? is a British documentary series that aired on BBC One from 9 September 2004 to 18 August 2005. It was presented by Richard Hammond, where he looked at the science behind headline health scares. The series has been repeated on Dave.

Episode list

Series 1
Episode 1: Mobile Phones – 9 September 2004
Episode 2: Sausages – 16 September 2004
Episode 3: MRSA – 23 September 2004
Episode 4: Water – 30 September 2004
Episode 5: The Office – 7 October 2004
Episode 6: Salmon – 14 October 2004
Episode 7: Flying – 21 October 2004
Episode 8: Spending – 28 October 2004

Series 2
Episode 1: Takeaways – 14 July 2005
Episode 2: Additives – 21 July 2005
Episode 3: Exercise – 28 July 2005
Episode 4: Jabs – 4 August 2005
Episode 5: Drinking – 11 August 2005
Episode 6: Ageing – 18 August 2005

External links

2004 British television series debuts
2005 British television series endings
2000s British documentary television series
BBC television documentaries